The Australian national under-19 rugby union team formerly represented Australia on a national level in age graded rugby union. The team competed in all four editions of the Under 19 Rugby World Championship, winning the title in 2006, and finishing third in 2005 and 2007.

Starting in 2008, the International Rugby Board scrapped its under-21 and under-19 world championships in favour of a single under-20 competition, the IRB Junior World Championship. Australia accordingly replaced its under-21 and under-19 sides with a new under-20 side.

Record

Results 2004 to 2007

2007 Under 19 World Championship – (3rd place)

2006 Under 19 World Championship – (1st place)

2005 Under 19 World Championship – (3rd place)

2004 Under 19 World Championship – (6th place)

See also

 Australia national under-20 rugby union team
 Australia national under-21 rugby union team

References

Rugby Australia Under 19